Deinacrida elegans is a species of wētā in family Anostostomatidae. It is endemic to New Zealand.

Description
Deinacrida elegans is a species of wētā, one of New Zealand’s largest terrestrial invertebrates. The genus Deinacrida comprises a diverse group of 11 species of wētā, with D. elegans being one of the seven species that lives in the South Island. Their size and description can be associated with their slow life history and speciation.  This particular species is moderately large but is outstanding in colour patterns and is unique to the rocky bluffs on the eastern side of the Southern Alps.

D. elegans has a handsome appearance, hence the Latin name elegans, meaning neat and elegant. This species of wētā is moderately large, long-legged and steel grey with distinctive red, black and white banded femora. The male D. elegans weighs 80g, with the considerably larger female weighing between 114-165g.  D. elegans has a brown, mirror-patterned thorax with smooth, rounded, pale grey edges. Black antenna, 2.5 times the total body length, extrude from the striped greyish brown head capsule.

Between juvenile and adult stages, D. elegans change little in their appearance other than their colouration. The juvenile wētā are largely black with white spines and leg joints, and as they mature, they assume their dark brown, red and grey pigmentation.

Identification
This species of wētā is moderately large, steel grey, and long shaped with distinctive red, black banded femora with slender hind tibiae with 7 or 8 fixed spines along with a single articulated distal spine in the inner row.

Weight: Male 80g, females 114-165g.

Head: Flagellum of antenna black, head capsule including mandibles.

Thorax: Prosternum that has two moderate blunt spines; meso-and metasternum considerably wide, but do not have distinct lateral lobes.

Legs: Relatively slender and long; fore-and mid-coxae with a lateral spine.

Abdomen: Tergites are smooth and almost shiny with feeble transverse striae, in centre, tan brown with pale grey edges, with no trace of a mid-dorsal ridge.

The wētā's body is built with a structure of repeated cylindrical segments or units. These are divided into three sections:

1: one section for receiving information about its environment and for feeling (the head).

2: one section, responsible for locomotion (the thorax).

3: one section that is used for reproduction (the abdomen).

Head
The head is the most important part of the insect that encounters food or danger or a possible mate. It is thus the focal point, containing the sense organs of touch, vision, taste and smell. Even though six segments can be seen in the head section, it is fused into a rigid single unit known as the head capsule, bearing the antennae, the eyes and the mouthparts. Due to this head part being rigid, the facial expression is always the same.

Thorax
Joining the head to the thorax is a short neck. The thorax in all insects consists of three segments. These segments are clearly visible along the back of the wētā. Each segment of the thorax bears a pair of legs. The wētā does not have wings attached to its thorax.

Abdomen
The abdomen of the wētā is the largest and simplest part of its body. It is round, smooth, and lacks appendages except at its rear end. Because of this its functions are mainly internal, serving as an expandable container for the sex organs and digestive organs.

Distribution

Natural global range 
Bluff wētā are only found in New Zealand and are endemic.

New Zealand range 
There are two areas in New Zealand where the bluff wētā are found: in the Kaikoura region, both the seaward and inland ranges, and at Mt Somers, in South Canterbury. There they are locally known as the Mt Somers wētā, but are still the same species, Deinacrida elegans. This species can also be in Middlehurst Station, Inland Kaikoura Range, Hapuku River, and Seaward Kaikoura Range. Wētā in the Kaikoura Ranges have not been discovered below 1100m and it seems that they are confined to alpine habitats.

Habitat preferences 
Thanks to its long legs, Deinacrida elegans is a great rock climber and is found on vertical rocky bluffs, inside dark narrow crevasses and occasionally under dense overhanging plants. Their preferred habitat conditions are clean, dry, horizontal cavities about 800 and 1800m above sea level which allow the wētā to lodge themselves in as far from light as possible.

The difference in this species compared to others in New Zealand and the way they have evolved in the South Island was most likely in response to habitat diversification associated with Pliocene mountain building. Although this is where these organisms live, in some cases the cliff habitat is challenging even for those which have a planned body-type for this sort of habitat. This is supported by the fact of dry sun-bleached carcasses found in the surrounding areas.

Life cycle/phenology
Giant wētā only live for two years, and take one year to reach sexual maturity.

Bluff wētā chose to stay deep inside their dens (in the rock) during winter and the colder months, and during snow events, to conserve body heat. As the temperatures warm, the wētā move closer to the exterior and become more active, spending the most time out in the open in the summer months (late December through to February), showing that they are more active during periods of higher temperatures. This coincides with the wētā's breeding season, which requires them to be more active to find suitable mates.

Mating
Wētā find suitable mates through a process known as ‘scramble competition polygyny’. This is a mating technique where receptive females wander until a male is attracted, with a chase ensuing until the female chooses the male she wishes to mate with. This is a non-aggressive method of finding a mate. Aside from mating, wētā rarely display any social behaviour even if found more than one in the same slit.

With wētā there is no pair bond, so the adults spend a lot of effort finding partners. Giant wētā with their solitary lifecycle, need to find each other. They do this mainly when they are active at night. The female produces a special odour (a pheromone) when she is ready to mate. The males will then track her down by following the scented trail. The wētā's long antennae play an important role in this.

Egg laying
Wētā eggs can be laid in nearly almost any month. April and May are known as the favourite times, because this is when the hard summer soil is softened by the autumn rains, so the eggs can be laid more easily. Eggs are about 6mm long and 1.5mm thick. Their colour is dark brown and slightly sausage-like in shape. They live in the soil over the winter period, then hatch in October or November. During their long incubation period, soil conditions are important but not well understood

The tiny juvenile wētā breaks the eggshell and then struggles its way up to the soil surface. The hatchlings appear just like miniature wētā, with very long antennae and excellent jumping legs.

Ecdysis/moulting
During ecdysis, the exoskeleton opens dorsally, giving way for the emergence of the animal along with its new exoskeleton. Overall this process lasts 2–3 hours. When the wētā is at the nymph stage, after it emerges, it will look for a dark place to allow time for its white-rose coloured exoskeleton to become hardened and pigmented. This process occurs in approximately 24 hours.

Diet and foraging
 
The Anostostomtidae (Orthoptera) Deinacrida elegans along with other South Island wētā species are unique to other wētā as they have fundamentally herbivorous behaviour. Deinacrida elegans feed predominantly on the leaves of trees and shrubs, but the evolutionary process is not well understood. In the wild, wētā are mainly herbivores, but are also known to eat insects. All species of giant wētā feed mainly on leaves.

Wētā are able to be kept in captivity quite satisfactorily on a diet of fresh carrot and leaves. However, if supplied with a freshly killed grasshopper or even another wētā, they will quite happily change from the vegetable diet and eat these insects. In the wild, they do not get many chances to eat living insects, because their hunting ability is not great. Mostly their animal diet will come from encounters with dying, dead or sedentary insects.

Predators, parasites, and diseases

This species is currently considered naturally uncommon and in the category of at risk. Any signs of population decline indicate a threat to the species and should be followed by immediate action. Rodents are the most apparent risk to the species at this stage. Although they are somewhat protected by the landscape they inhabit, with many places to hide within the shrubs and steep, rocky cliffs, if there is a rapid increase in rodent populations, predator control may need to be considered.

Prior to the arrival of human introduced predators, wētā were hunted by tuatara, lizards, short-tailed bats and birds. Even today, scientists like Meads and Notman have seen tuatara take Deinacrida wētā. Wētā remains have been frequently discovered in tuatara faecal pellets.

After the colonization of New Zealand, mammalian predators were introduced. These quickly became efficient predators of wētā. Hedgehogs are an example of an introduced predator. These predators have learnt how to quickly kill wētā by suppressing or avoiding the wētā's defense mechanisms. The hedgehog can hold the wētā with its front paws to prevent the wētā defense mechanism, which is to raise its hind legs. Then the hedgehog will bite the wētā with its powerful jaw.

Another defense mechanism to avoid predation or unfavorable conditions is using its legs to leap away and then roll with its legs tucked up.

The morepork is the main native predator that hunts for wētā at night. It has the ability to spot them sitting on the trunks of trees. The size of the wētā is no problem to the morepork, because even gigantic wētā remains have been found in nest debris on Little Barrier Island.

New Zealand specialists
New Zealand lacks any native mammals, apart from the native bats, and therefore the ecology of New Zealand's ecosystem is unique. The wētā plays a large part in this, taking on the niche of a forest floor mammal (such as a mouse) in New Zealand. This has resulted in wētā undergoing gigantism, a process in which an isolated population grows larger than its relatives due to a lack of predators and/or an abundant food source. Therefore, the wētā is thought to be the effective equivalent of a mouse in New Zealand ecosystems. This is particularly obvious in predation and diet similarities of the wētā and mouse. Therefore, although mice may not directly prey upon wētā, the wētā numbers decrease when mice numbers are high, due to competition.

Interesting fact
The bluff wētā has a distorted abdomen which seems to be related to its habitat where this species is compressed against crevices. It was also observed that bluff wētā gets out of its shelter by day for a sunbath.

Cultural uses
As wētā are endemic to New Zealand, they have become a local icon of sorts, using the wētā symbol in advertising and as a business and marketing tool, for example Weta Digital, a special effects company founded by Peter Jackson.

References

External links

 Radio New Zealand Critter of the Week - the Bluff weta

Weta
Endemic fauna of New Zealand
Insects described in 1999
Anostostomatidae
Endemic insects of New Zealand